"Hula Hoop" is a song by Jamaican singer Omi. It was released on 28 August 2015 as the second single from his debut studio album Me 4 U (2015). The song was written by Omar Pasley (OMI), Karl Wolf, Jenson Vaughan, Matt James and Frank Buelles.

Music video
The music video was released on 16 September 2015. A broadcast radio station in Miami announces a competition for picking a lead girl for Omi's "Hula Hoop" video and a number of candidates flock to the sea shore to apply. A judging panel watches the dancers perform to pick Omi's partner on his video.

Charts

Weekly charts

Year-end charts

Certifications

Release history

References

2015 singles
2015 songs
Ultra Music singles
Songs written by Jenson Vaughan